Edward John Drea (born 24 February 1944) is an American military historian. He deals especially with the Imperial Japanese Army and the Pacific War.

Early life and education 
Edward John Drea was born in Buffalo, New York, on 24 February 1944. He attended local grammar and high schools, and then entered Canisius College in Buffalo.

Career 
On graduation, in 1965, he joined the United States Air Force. He was sent for officer training at the Air Force Officer Training School at the Medina Training Annex at Lackland Air Force Base in San Antonio, Texas, and then to Lowry Air Force Base in Denver, Colorado, where he was trained as an intelligence officer. He was posted to the headquarters of the Fifth Air Force at Fuchū in Japan, arriving on 20 January 1968, where he monitored communications from communist countries. The
Pueblo Incident four days after he arrived resulted in a heavy workload.

Drea served a combat tour in Vietnam. In 1971, he entered the Sophia University in Tokyo on the G.I. Bill, earning a Master of Arts (M.A.) degree. Classes were taught in English and Japanese, and he became fluent in Japanese. He was awarded a Japanese ministry of education dissertation fellowship, which allowed him to gain a Doctor of Philosophy (PhD) in modern Japanese history from the University of Kansas in 1978, writing his thesis on "The Japanese General Election of 1942: a Study of Political Institutions in Wartime". He joined the Combat Studies Institute of the Command and General Staff College in Fort Leavenworth, Kansas in 1975, and became the head of the Research and Analysis Department at the US Army Center for Military History in Washington, D.C. He also taught at United States Army War College.

Awards 
In 2003, he received the Samuel Eliot Morison Prize for lifetime achievement from the Society for Military History.

Bibliography

Notes 

1944 births
Living people
American military historians
Writers from Buffalo, New York
Canisius College alumni
Sophia University alumni
University of Kansas alumni
Historians from New York (state)